Harmostes fraterculus is a species of scentless plant bug in the family Rhopalidae. It is found in the Caribbean, Central America, and North America.

References

Further reading

 
 
 

Insects described in 1832
Rhopalinae